Zapaleri is a volcano whose summit is the tripoint of the borders of Argentina, Bolivia and Chile. A number of railways are in the area. It is part of Potosí Department (Bolivia), Jujuy Province (Argentina), and Antofagasta Region (Chile). The volcano formed on top of the 2.89 mya Tara Ignimbrite from the Guacha caldera and the basement beneath the volcano is formed from Cretaceous and Tertiary rocks affected by tectonic deformation. Volcanic rocks are andesite, basalt, dacite and rhyolite. Late Cretaceous rocks are also found in the area, as are Pleistocene shoshonite volcanic rocks.

The Bolivian portion of the mountain is protected within Eduardo Avaroa Andean Fauna National Reserve. Moreover, it is close to the sector Salar de Tara-Salar de Aguas Calientes of Los Flamencos National Reserve, Chile.

The obsidian is found on the Bolivian side of the border next to Laguna Blanca. Another source is found on Solterio Mountain. Inca and earlier archeological remains are associated with the obsidian sites.

References

External links

Volcanoes of Antofagasta Region
Volcanoes of Potosí Department
Landforms of Jujuy Province
Mountains of Argentina
Mountains of Chile
Headlands of Chile
Argentina–Chile border
Bolivia–Chile border
Argentina–Bolivia border
International mountains of South America
Border tripoints
Five-thousanders of the Andes
Mountains of Antofagasta Region
Mountains of Jujuy Province
Mountains of Potosí Department